Sidorovo is a rural locality (a village) in Nikolskoye Rural Settlement, Ustyuzhensky District, Vologda Oblast, Russia. The population was 6 as of 2002.

Geography 
Vorontsy is the nearest rural locality.

References 

Rural localities in Ustyuzhensky District